Lake Hattie Township is a township in Hubbard County, Minnesota, United States. The population was 130 at the 2000 census.

Geography

History
Lake Hattie Township, together with most of the northwest corner of Hubbard County, was surveyed during 1879 by George F. Hamilton, deputy surveyor.  Lake Hattie Township was organized jointly with Fern Township at a meeting at the home of E.O. Howe on August 6, 1898.

Demographics

As of the census of 2000, there were 130 people, 50 households, and 31 families residing in the township. The population density was 3.9 people per square mile (1.5/km2). There were 101 housing units at an average density of 3.0/sq mi (1.2/km2). The racial makeup of the township was 93.85% White, 4.62% Native American, 0.77% from other races, and 0.77% from two or more races.

There were 50 households, out of which 30.0% had children under the age of 18 living with them, 60.0% were married couples living together, 2.0% had a female householder with no husband present, and 38.0% were non-families. 30.0% of all households were made up of individuals, and 10.0% had someone living alone who was 65 years of age or older. The average household size was 2.60 and the average family size was 3.35.

In the township the population was spread out, with 30.0% under the age of 18, 7.7% from 18 to 24, 25.4% from 25 to 44, 24.6% from 45 to 64, and 12.3% who were 65 years of age or older. The median age was 38 years. For every 100 females, there were 100.0 males. For every 100 females age 18 and over, there were 106.8 males.

The median income for a household in the township was $26,563, and the median income for a family was $33,125. Males had a median income of $41,250 versus $14,750 for females. The per capita income for the township was $15,679. There were 20.0% of families and 14.7% of the population living below the poverty line, including 10.0% of under eighteens and 23.1% of those over 64.

References

Townships in Hubbard County, Minnesota
Townships in Minnesota